Patricio Elías Vidal (born 8 April 1992 in San Miguel de Tucumán) is an Argentine football forward who plays for Brown de Adrogué.

External links
 
 

1992 births
Living people
Sportspeople from San Miguel de Tucumán
Argentine footballers
Argentine expatriate footballers
Association football midfielders
Club Atlético Independiente footballers
Unión Española footballers
Unión La Calera footballers
Club Atlético Sarmiento footballers
Oriente Petrolero players
Club Atlético Alvarado players
C.D. Olmedo footballers
Club Atlético Brown footballers
Chilean Primera División players
Argentine Primera División players
Primera Nacional players
Bolivian Primera División players
Ecuadorian Serie A players
Argentine expatriate sportspeople in Chile
Expatriate footballers in Chile
Argentine expatriate sportspeople in Bolivia
Expatriate footballers in Bolivia
Argentine expatriate sportspeople in Ecuador
Expatriate footballers in Ecuador